Collozoum is a radiolarian genus formerly reported in the subfamily Sphaerozoidae, now reported descending from the order Collodaria. The genus contains bioluminescent species. It is a genus of colonial radiolarians (as opposed to solitary).

Species
The following species are recognized:
 Collozoum inerme (J. Müller, 1856)

References

Radiolarian genera
Bioluminescent radiolarians